Grace Holmes Carlson (1906–1992) was an American Marxist politician.

Background

Grace Holmes Carlson was born on November 13, 1906, in St. Paul, Minnesota and studied in local Catholic schools.

Career

Carlson was a professor of psychology at the University of Minnesota. In 1940, Carlson was the Socialist Workers Party candidate for United States Senator in Minnesota, receiving almost 9,000 votes. In 1941, as a leading member of the Socialist Workers Party she was imprisoned under the Smith Act together with Farrell Dobbs and many other SWP leaders for opposing the US involvement in World War II. After her 16-month prison sentence, she became an activist for better conditions for women prisoners.

In 1948, Carlson ran as the Socialist Workers Party vice presidential candidate in presidential election with Dobbs as presidential candidate.  In 1950, she ran again as a U.S. House of Reperesentatives candidate for Minnesota's 5th district 1950.

In 1952, Carlson left the SWP, citing conflict with her Catholic beliefs. James P. Cannon, the central leader of the SWP famously penned the article "How We Won Grace Carlson and How We Lost Her" following her resignation which focused on the extreme right-wing pressures of the McCarthy period as the material basis for Carlson's departure.

Death

Grace Carlson died age 85 on July 7, 1992.

See also

 Socialist Workers Party (United States) 
 Farrell Dobbs 
 James P. Cannon

References 

1906 births
1992 deaths
American anti-war activists
American Christian socialists
Christian communists
People convicted under the Smith Act
People from Saint Paul, Minnesota
Politicians from Saint Paul, Minnesota
University of Minnesota faculty
Politicians from Minneapolis
1948 United States vice-presidential candidates
Female candidates for Vice President of the United States
Women in Minnesota politics
Socialist Workers Party (United States) politicians
Socialist Workers Party (United States) vice presidential nominees
Catholic socialists
Female Christian socialists
Candidates in the 1948 United States presidential election
20th-century American politicians
Minnesota socialists